is a Japanese actor and voice actor from Tokyo Metropolis. He is a graduate of the art department of Nihon University and is affiliated with Serikawa Office. He was previously affiliated with Gekidan Subaru.

Filmography

Television drama
Abarenbō Shōgun III (Harukichi)
Haru no Hatō (Newspaper reporter)
Musashi (Old man)
Sangamoyu (Civil defense worker)
Uchū Keiji Shariban (Mysterious old man)

Film
Hana-bi (Old hick)
Madame to Nyōbō (Musician)

Theatrical animation
Alice in Wonderland (Cheshire Cat)
Dumbo (Stork)
The Sword in the Stone (Pellinor)
101 Dalmatians II: Patch's London Adventure (Police Sergeant)
Hercules
Tarzan (Gbeedul)
Tarzan 2 (Gbeedul)
Tarzan and Jane (Gbeedul)
The Jungle Book (Monkey C)
The Jungle Book 2 (Monkey C)
The Many Adventures of Winnie the Pooh (Pony Canyon edition) (Eeyore)
The Rescuers Down Under (Frank)
The Black Cauldon
The Small One
Pocahontas II: Journey to a New World
Lady and the Tramp II: Scamp's Adventure (Zero)
Monsters, Inc. (Claws)
A Bug's Life (Molt)
Disney productions (Pony Canyon and Bandai editions) (Donald Duck)
Pinocchio (Pony Canyon edition) (J. Worthington "Honest John" Foulfellow)
Peter Pan (Pony Canyon edition) (Pirates Herius)
Peter and the Wolf (Pony Canyon edition) (Ivan)
Robin Hood (Pony Canyon edition) (Richard King)
Bongo (Pony Canyon edition) (Circus Master)
Song of the South (Pony Canyon edition) (Br'er Fox)
Song of the South 2 (Pony Canyon edition) (Br'er Fox)

Other
Mickey Mouse Revue (Donald Duck)

External links
Serikawa profile

1944 births
Living people
Japanese male film actors
Japanese male television actors
Japanese male voice actors
Male voice actors from Tokyo Metropolis
Nihon University alumni